Southwest is a 2012 Brazilian drama film directed by Eduardo Nunes.

Cast
 Simone Spoladore as Clarisse
 Dira Paes

References

External links
 

2012 films
2010s Portuguese-language films
2012 drama films
Brazilian drama films